Leon Charles Constantine (born 24 February 1978) is an English former footballer who played as a striker. A journeyman of lower league English football, he had 21 separate spells at 19 different clubs within the space of just 12 years. A latecomer to the professional game, he found a Football League club at age 22, and was a regular first-team player for the first time at age 23.

Beginning his career as a Millwall reserve following an impressive spell at non-League Edgware Town, in 2002 he joined Brentford. He was unimpressive however and moved on to Southend United the following year, where he proved to be a goal-ever-other-game revelation. In 2004, he enjoyed a short spell with Peterborough United before Torquay United broke their club record in signing him. Again he disappointed, and in 2005 moved on to Port Vale. With Vale he was once more prolific, scoring 32 goals in 72 league games. In 2007 Leeds United were persuaded to sign him, though he fared poorly before transferring to Northampton Town the following year. He spent the 2009–10 season at Hereford United, followed by a spell with York City. He left York in 2011 for brief spells at Braintree Town, Lewes, Tooting & Mitcham United, Boston United, Arlesey Town, Brimsdown and then Enfield Borough. In addition to all of these clubs he has also had loan spells with Leyton Orient, Partick Thistle, Torquay United, Oldham Athletic, and Cheltenham Town over the years.

Career

Early career
Born in Hackney, London, Constantine played for Edgware Town before joining Millwall on 31 August 2000 for a £6,000 fee. He made his debut for Millwall on 30 September, coming on as a late substitute for Paul Ifill in a 4–1 win away to Peterborough United.

He had loan spells with Leyton Orient and Partick Thistle, before moving to Wally Downes's Brentford on a free transfer in August 2002. He struggled to establish himself at Griffin Park and in August 2003 joined Southend United, initially on non-contract terms, signing a permanent deal the following month. He finished as the club's top-scorer in the 2003–04 season with 25 goals in 53 appearances.

He helped Southend to reach the 2004 Football League Trophy Final at the Millennium Stadium, where they were beaten 2–0 by Blackpool. He turned down the offer of a new two-year contract from Southend and joined Peterborough United on a two-year contract in May 2004, scoring his first and what turned out to be only goal for the club against Milton Keynes Dons on 7 December. In October 2004, he joined Torquay United on loan and in December 2004 moved to Torquay for a club record fee of an initial £75,000, which depending on additional clauses could have risen to £100,000 and included a sell-on fee of 25%.

Despite scoring a hat-trick in a 3–1 win at former club Brentford on 26 December, his form was disappointing for Torquay. He scored just seven times in 38 appearances, and was transfer-listed in October 2005 by Torquay manager Leroy Rosenior, along with Darren Garner, Mamadou Sow, Carl Priso, Morike Sako and Nick Skinner.

Port Vale
Constantine moved to Port Vale on loan on 4 November 2005, with the transfer becoming permanent for a fee of £20,000 in January 2006. On 8 November 2006, he opened the scoring against Tottenham Hotspur in a League Cup tie at White Hart Lane, though Spurs went on to win the game 3–1 in extra-time. In the 2006–07 season he broke a record, becoming the only Port Vale player to score more than 17 goals before Christmas. This happened when he scored twice against Brighton & Hove Albion on 23 December 2006.

He was set to move to Championship club Barnsley in the January 2007 transfer window, Vale agreeing a fee of £200,000 plus Marc Richards. However, the deal fell through when neither club could agree terms. In January 2007 Brighton offered Vale £150,000 for the striker, but Constantine insisted he was happy at Vale Park. Despite finishing the season with 26 goals in all competitions for Port Vale (38 in 18 months for the club) he was never a fan favourite at Vale Park, and instead picked up a vocal minority of detractors who condemned his relaxed attitude on the pitch as proof of him being "lazy".

Leeds United
Constantine had been linked with a number of League One clubs throughout pre-season, however he agreed a contract in principle with Leeds United when they were in administration, paying out of his own pocket to take part in the pre-season programme. Leeds later completed the signing of Constantine on a two-year contract on 7 August 2007. Constantine started his first game for Leeds in the 2–1 defeat to Bury in the Football League Trophy where he scored in the 8th minute. His career at Leeds was blighted by injury, however, leading to him only making a handful of appearances for the club.

Constantine scored his first league goal for Leeds in their 3–1 home defeat at the hands of Oldham Athletic on 1 January 2008. However, he was hit by injury again, breaking his arm in this same game after scoring, leading to a two-month lay-off. In March, Constantine was sent to Oldham on loan to help him re-gain match fitness, scoring twice in seven appearances.

Northampton Town
On 2 July Constantine completed a free transfer move to League One side Northampton Town after falling out of favour with Gary McAllister. After only scoring three goals for Northampton and receiving boos from the club's own fans, he joined League One rivals Cheltenham Town on a one-month loan on 20 March 2009. He returned to Northampton on 20 April after scoring one goal against Huddersfield Town in six matches.

Hereford United
Having been released by Northampton, Constantine signed for Hereford United one a one-year contract on 29 June 2009, becoming the first striker signed by new coach John Trewick following his clear out of club's playing staff. He was released at the end of the season following a disappointing year.

York City

He joined Conference Premier side York City on a contract until the end of the 2010–11 season on 3 September 2010, teaming up with his former manager at Port Vale, Martin Foyle. The next day he made his debut, scoring the second goal in a 2–0 victory over Rushden & Diamonds. Constantine scored on his first start for York with the second goal in a 2–0 victory over Hayes & Yeading United on 18 September. Having finished the season with eight goals in 29 appearances he was released by York on 23 June 2011 after being told he could find another club.

Later career
Constantine had an unsuccessful trial with League Two club Barnet in July and played in a pre-season friendly against Peterborough. He then went on trial with newly promoted Conference Premier side Braintree Town and recorded a goal and an assist in a game against Billericay Town. Constantine completed a permanent move to Braintree after training with them in pre-season and made his debut when he appeared as a second-half substitute in Braintree's 5–0 win over Grimsby Town. Constantine failed to make a further appearance for Braintree and was released in October.

He signed with Isthmian League Premier Division side Lewes, for whom he made one league appearance against Canvey Island on 8 October. This was followed by a spell with fellow Isthmian League Premier Division side Tooting & Mitcham United, playing one game against Metropolitan Police on 19 November. He then signed for Boston United of the Conference North on a contract until the end of the 2011–12 season, making his debut as a substitute in the side's 4–2 Boxing Day victory at home to Eastwood Town. He was released by the club on 11 March 2012 having scored one goal in two starts and eight substitute appearances. He later had spells in the Spartan South Midlands League playing for Arlesey Town, Brimsdown and Enfield Borough. He went on to work as a football consultant at a sports agency company and opened his own football academy.

Career statistics

Honours
Southend United
Football League Trophy runner-up: 2004

Individual
Football League One Player of the Month: August 2006

References

External links

1978 births
Living people
Footballers from Hackney Central
English footballers
Black British sportspeople
Association football forwards
Edgware Town F.C. players
Millwall F.C. players
Leyton Orient F.C. players
Partick Thistle F.C. players
Brentford F.C. players
Southend United F.C. players
Peterborough United F.C. players
Torquay United F.C. players
Port Vale F.C. players
Leeds United F.C. players
Oldham Athletic A.F.C. players
Northampton Town F.C. players
Cheltenham Town F.C. players
Hereford United F.C. players
York City F.C. players
Braintree Town F.C. players
Lewes F.C. players
Tooting & Mitcham United F.C. players
Boston United F.C. players
Arlesey Town F.C. players
Brimsdown F.C. players
Enfield Borough F.C. players
English Football League players
National League (English football) players
Isthmian League players
Scottish Football League players